Schoettella is a genus of springtails and allies in the family Hypogastruridae. There are about 13 described species in Schoettella.

Species
 Schoettella alba Folsom, 1932
 Schoettella andina Dìaz & Palacios-Vargas, 1983
 Schoettella celiae Fernandes & de Mendonça, 1998
 Schoettella distincta (Denis, 1931)
 Schoettella glasgowi (Folsom, 1916)
 Schoettella hodgsoni (Carpenter, 1908)
 Schoettella idahoensis (Wray, 1958)
 Schoettella janiae Palacios-Vargas, 1979
 Schoettella novajaniae Palacios-Vargas & Castaño-Meneses, 1998
 Schoettella subcorta Salmon, 1941
 Schoettella tristani (Denis, 1931)
 Schoettella ununguiculata (Tullberg, 1869)
 Schoettella ununguiculatus

References

Springtail genera